Microbacterium mangrovi is a Gram-positive and non-spore-forming bacterium from the genus Microbacterium which has been isolated from mangrove soil from Tanjung Lumpur in Malaysia.

References

External links
Type strain of Microbacterium mangrovi at BacDive -  the Bacterial Diversity Metadatabase	

Bacteria described in 2014
mangrovi